B.V. Raju Institute of Technology (BVRIT) is an engineering college established in 1997 in Vishnupur, Narsapur, Medak, Telangana State, India.  BVRIT is affiliated with Jawaharlal Nehru Technological University, Hyderabad (JNTUH), University Grants Commission (India) (UGC Autonomous),  accredited by the National Board of Accreditation (NBA) and National Assessment and Accreditation Council (NAAC). It is one of the educational institutes of the Sri Vishnu Educational Society. The founding chairman of the Sri Vishnu Educational Society is Padmabhushan Dr BV Raju and current chairman is Sri K V Vishnu Raju, CMD, Anjani Portland Cements.

History
Padmabhushan Dr. Bhupathiraju Vissam Raju (Padmabhushan Dr. B. V. Raju) is the founder and chairman of the Dr. B.V. Raju Foundation and the B.V. Raju Institute of Technology. Three campuses have been established: one at Narasapur in Medak (Dist) in 1997, where an engineering college has been set up called B.V. Raju Institute of Technology, the second one at Bhimavaram which includes a pharmacy school, a computer programming department, an engineering school for women and a dental college and the other one at Rajiv Gandhi Nagar Colony, near Bachupally  in 2012, where an engineering college has been setup in the name BVRITH College of Engineering for Women.

On 27 November 2004, the government of Andhra Pradesh established its first District Knowledge Center (DKC), also called Jawahar Knowledge Center(JKC) under the campus placement mission. It is governed by the Institute of Electronic Governance at the college campus and was inaugurated by the then chief minister Dr. Y. S. Raja Sekhara Reddy. The college JKC has been awarded the Best JKC for the year 2007.

Campus
The campus has three blocks : Main (or APJ Abdul Kalam), Eastern (or Visvesvarayya) and Western (or Arya Bhatta).

Academic programmes
Undergraduate courses
 Biomedical engineering
 Chemical engineering
 Computer Science and Engineering
 Information Technology
 Electronics and Communications Engineering
 Electrical and Electronics Engineering
 Mechanical Engineering
 Civil Engineering
 Pharmaceutical Engineering

Postgraduate courses
 Master of Business Administration (MBA)
 Master of Computer Applications (MCA)
 VLSI System Design
 Embedded systems
 Computer Science & Engineering
 Software Engineering
 Chemical Engineering
 Electrical Power Systems
 Power Engineering & Energy Systems
 Engineering Design
 Pharmaceutical Engineering

Library
The central library covers 706 square metres and has a seating capacity of around 140. It has around 3,000 titles and 29,000 volumes. The college is a member of Sonnet, an A.P. Government "Society for networking for excellence in Technical education", and receives 230 online journals from Sonnet. BVRIT has access to its subscribed 12 international journals and 89 Indian journals and an electronic library where students can access books and journals from e-publications.

In 2001 the college started a Book Bank Scheme offering a complete set of text books to each student for the entire semester or academic year at a nominal rent.

Facilities

Students can stay in the campus, where girls and boys are accommodated separately. The hostels can accommodate about 500 girls and 1000 boys and further hostels are under construction. BVRIT provides quarters within the campus for its staff. The college has a health care facility which provides medical care for the staff and students. It has a qualified doctor who is available at all times on the campus and arranges regular medical checkups for the students and staff. BVRIT has dining hall and a cafeteria called 'Daffodils' as well as a Food Court (FC) with delicious food. The student committees decides the menus. There are fast food outlets in addition to the cafeteria.

The college has a 600-seat auditorium inaugurated by former president of India, Dr A. P. J. Abdul Kalam. BVRIT has introduced a learning atmosphere through an e-classroom which is used to develop communication skills, in–team based projects and curriculum-prescribed course work.

The Ganesh Temple is located in the campus. An artificial lake and a boating club have been established where students and faculty members can take a boat ride.

BVRIT is located around 50 km from Hyderabad and runs about 50 buses from in and around the city. It can also be reached by buses from JBS and Balanagar.

Kalam's visit

Dr A. P. J. Abdul Kalam visited the college on 27 August 2007 and addressed the students. During his visit he inaugurated the 600-seat auditorium and the Sri Vishnu College of Pharmacy.

See also 
Education in India
Literacy in India
List of institutions of higher education in Telangana

References

External links

 

Engineering colleges in Telangana
1997 establishments in Andhra Pradesh
Educational institutions established in 1997